Frank Cecil Eve FRCP (15 February 1871–7 December 1952) was a senior British physician, made famous by the "Eve Method" of artificial respiration.

Biography

Born on 15 February 1871 in Silsoe, Bedfordshire, Frank Eve was educated at Bedford School, at Emmanuel College, Cambridge, and at St Thomas's Hospital Medical School. He subsequently became a Consultant Physician at the Hull Royal Infirmary. In 1915, he was elected as a Fellow of the Royal College of Physicians. In 1932, his description of a new "rocking" method of artificial respiration, which came to be known as the "Eve Method" and was adopted by the Royal Navy and by the Swedish Navy, brought Eve international fame.

Frank Eve died in Beverley on 7 December 1952.

References

1871 births
1952 deaths
People educated at Bedford School
Alumni of Emmanuel College, Cambridge
Alumni of St Thomas's Hospital Medical School
Fellows of the Royal College of Physicians
20th-century English medical doctors
People from Central Bedfordshire District